Lindsay Davenport and Natasha Zvereva were the defending champions and won in the final 6–4, 2–6, 6–4 against Alexandra Fusai and Nathalie Tauziat.

Seeds
Champion seeds are indicated in bold text while text in italics indicates the round in which those seeds were eliminated. The top four seeded teams received byes into the second round.

Draw

Final

Top half

Bottom half

Qualifying

Seeds

Qualifiers
  Cara Black /  Lilia Osterloh

Lucky losers
  Åsa Carlsson /  Li Fang

Qualifying draw

External links
 1998 State Farm Evert Cup Doubles Draw
 WTA draw archive

Doubles
1998 Newsweek Champions Cup and the State Farm Evert Cup